North Woods Law is an American reality television series that debuted on March 11, 2012, on the Animal Planet channel. Originally set in Maine, the show followed numerous game wardens of the Maine Warden Service. In 2017, the show changed locations to New Hampshire, following members of the state's Fish and Game Department. The series was renewed for a sixteenth season, which began on June 20, 2021.

Lone Star Law is a spin-off series set in Texas.

Cast
Maine

Ryan Fitzpatrick
Chris Simmons
Scott Thrasher
Tim Spahr
Jonathan Parker
Alan Curtis
Rick LaFlamme
Kris MacCabe
Josh Bubier
Ray Dineen
Helen Dineen
Eric Blanchard
Aaron Cross
Cody Lounder
Pete Herring
Josh Beal
Troy Thibodeau
Dan Christianson
Jason Luce

New Hampshire

Glen Lucas
Jon Demler
Heidi Murphy
Shawn Macfadzen
Ron Arsenault
Bob Mancini
Kevin Bronson
Bill Boudreau
K9 Ruby Boudreau
Eric Hannett
Graham Courtney
Adam Cheney
Geoff Pushee
Eric Fluette
K9 Moxie Fluette
Levi Frye
Rob McDermott
Josiah Towne
Chris Eagan
Matt Holmes
James Benvenuti
Joe Canfield 
K9 Cora Benvenuti
Richard Crouse
Brad Jones

Episodes

Season 1 (2012)

Season 2 (2013)

Season 3 (2013)

Season 4 (2014–15)

Season 5 (2015)

Season 6 (2015–16)

Season 7 (2016)

Season 8 (2017)

Season 9 (2017)

Season 10 (2018)

Season 11 (2018)

Season 12 (2019)

Season 13 (2019)

Special episodes

References

Further reading

External links
North Woods Law at Animal Planet

North Woods Law at The Futon Critic

2010s American reality television series
2012 American television series debuts
Animal Planet original programming
English-language television shows
Law enforcement in Maine
Law enforcement in New Hampshire
Television shows set in Maine
Television shows filmed in Maine
Television shows set in New Hampshire
Television shows filmed in New Hampshire